Callulops wilhelmanus is a species of frog in the family Microhylidae. It is endemic to the central mountain ranges of Papua New Guinea.
It lives on the forest floor. It can also adapt to live in degraded habitats, including rural gardens. It can be locally abundant although it does not typically occur at high densities.

References

wilhelmanus
Amphibians of Papua New Guinea
Endemic fauna of Papua New Guinea
Taxa named by Arthur Loveridge
Amphibians described in 1948
Taxonomy articles created by Polbot